Kiss Tomorrow Goodbye is a 1950 film noir starring James Cagney, directed by Gordon Douglas, produced by William Cagney and based on the novel by Horace McCoy.  The film was banned in Ohio as "a sordid, sadistic presentation of brutality and an extreme presentation of crime with explicit steps in commission."

Supporting Cagney are Luther Adler as a crooked lawyer, and Ward Bond and Barton MacLane as two crooked cops.

Plot
Ralph Cotter is a career criminal who, while escaping from a prison work camp, kills his escape partner, Carleton. On the outside, Cotter ultimately woos Carleton's sister, Holiday, by threatening to expose the fact that she was involved in arranging the prison break. Holiday does not know that Cotter killed her brother. There are hints of a sadomasochistic bond between the two in a scene where Cotter is provoked to whip Holiday with a wet towel, after which she passionately embraces him. Cotter quickly gets back into the crime game—only to be shaken down by corrupt local cops. Things become more complicated with each plan, and worsen when he turns the tables on the bad cops. Finally, Holiday discovers that Cotter killed her brother and that he is dumping her for a wealthy young heiress. She is thrown into a violent rage.

Cast
 James Cagney as Ralph Cotter
 Barbara Payton as Holiday Carleton
 Helena Carter as Margaret Dobson
 Ward Bond as Insp. Charles Weber
 Luther Adler as Keith 'Cherokee' Mandon
 Barton MacLane as Lt. John Reece
 Steve Brodie as Joe 'Jinx' Raynor
 Rhys Williams as Vic Mason
 Herbert Heyes as Ezra Dobson
 John Litel as Police Chief Tolgate
 William Frawley as Byers
 Gordon Richards as the Butler (uncredited)
 Neville Brand as Carleton, (Holiday’s Brother) (uncredited)

Production

Development
Kiss Tomorrow Goodbye was based on a bestselling novel by Horace McCoy that was published in 1948.

Humphrey Bogart and Robert Lord were interested in securing the film rights before the novel's publication, but in November 1949, the film rights were sold to William Schiffrin, an independent producer. In February 1950, the Cagney brothers bought the film rights. In March 1950, Barbara Payton was cast. Helena Carter joined the cast in April. Filming began on April 14, 1950, at General Service Studios.

Kiss Tomorrow Goodbye was the first of four movies that the Cagney brothers made for Warner Bros. James Cagney said that he and his brother entered into a deal in which they gave the banks the first $500,000 that the film made, in order to pay back debts from The Time of Your Lives.

The Cagneys liked Douglas' work and signed him to a multi-picture contract.

This was the second film in which Cagney appeared with William Frawley (Fred Mertz from I Love Lucy), following 1937's Something to Sing About.

Restoration/rerelease
In 2011, the film was restored by the UCLA Film & Television Archive in cooperation with Paramount Pictures, funded by the Packard Humanities Institute. The new print was made "from the original 35mm nitrate picture and track negatives and a 35mm safety print." The restoration premiered at the UCLA Festival of Preservation on March 14, 2011.

Reception

Critical response
Though often compared unfavorably to White Heat, Kiss Tomorrow Goodbye received mixed reviews. Critic Fred Camper, in The Chicago Reader, criticized the film's directing, writing: "Gordon Douglas's direction is almost incoherent compared to Raoul Walsh's in White Heat (1949), which features Cagney in a similar role; the compositions and camera movements, while momentarily effective, have little relationship to each other, and the film reads a bit like an orchestra playing without a conductor."

Film critic Dennis Schwartz generally liked the film and wrote: "This is an energetic straightforward crime drama based on the book by Horace McCoy (They Shoot Horses, Don't They?) and the screen play, which hardly makes sense and is the root of the film's problems, is by Harry Brown. Gordon M. Douglas (Come Fill the Cup/Only the Valiant) helms it by keeping it fast-paced, brutal and cynical, and lets star James Cagney pick up where he left off in the year earlier White Heat as an unsympathetic mad dog killer. This was an even tougher film, but the crowds did not respond to it as favorably as they did to White Heat (which seems odd, since it is basically the same type of B-movie)."

Filmink said: "Both Payton and Carter are a little too attractive looking for pudgy old Cagney, who was pushing fifty at the time – did he ever play such a stud muffin? It’s the biggest flaw in an otherwise solid gangster story."

References

External links

 
 
 
 
 Kiss Tomorrow Goodbye analysis by film journalist John O'Dowd at Film Noir of the Week
Kiss Tomorrow Goodbye at Letterbox DVD
 
Review of film at Variety

1950 films
1950 crime films
American crime thriller films
American black-and-white films
Film noir
Films based on American novels
Films directed by Gordon Douglas
Films scored by Carmen Dragon
Warner Bros. films
Films with screenplays by Harry Brown (writer)
1950s thriller films
1950s English-language films
1950s American films